Barnellan is a small hamlet in East Dunbartonshire, Scotland, situated in the civil parish of Baldernock. It consists of a few houses and a farm, the latter of which it got its name from. The nearest primary school is Baldernock Primary School.

Hamlets in East Dunbartonshire